Casper is a 1995 American fantasy film directed by Brad Silberling, in his feature film directorial debut, based on the Harvey Comics cartoon character Casper the Friendly Ghost created by Seymour Reit and Joe Oriolo. The film stars Christina Ricci, Bill Pullman, Cathy Moriarty and Eric Idle, with voice talents of Joe Nipote, Joe Alaskey, Brad Garrett and the film introduction of Malachi Pearson in the title role.

The film makes extensive use of computer-generated imagery to create the ghosts, and it is the first feature film to have a fully CGI character in the lead role. It goes for a much darker interpretation of the Friendly Ghost in comparison to the comics, cartoons and films of the previous years, especially with its theme of death, most notably providing the character a tragic backstory that addresses his death.

Casper was released in cinemas on May 26, 1995, by Universal Pictures. It received mixed reviews from critics, who praised the film for its faithfulness to its source material (specifically the title character's portrayal), visual effects, music score, and performances, but criticized its dark story and humor. The film earned $287.9 million on a $55 million budget, and spawned two direct-to-video/made-for-TV indirect prequels, Casper: A Spirited Beginning (1997) and Casper Meets Wendy (1998) as follow-ups to the film and released by 20th Century Fox, and an animated television spin-off, The Spooktacular New Adventures of Casper.

Plot
In Friendship, Maine, following the death of her father, neurotic and spoiled heiress Carrigan Crittenden discovers she has only been left Whipstaff Manor in his will while his vast wealth has gone to several charities. Carrigan and her lawyer Dibs find a map within the will's papers that tell of an alleged treasure hidden inside the manor, but find the property haunted by a friendly ghost named Casper and his poltergeist uncles the Ghostly Trio. They unsuccessfully attempt to force the ghosts out by way of paranormal experts and a demolitions team. A lonely Casper watches a news report about paranormal therapist James Harvey and is instantly smitten with his teenage daughter, Kat, prompting Casper to inspire Carrigan in summoning James to Whipstaff. Kat dislikes her father's reputation and obsession with contacting the ghost of his late wife, Amelia. The Harveys move into Whipstaff, but Casper's attempt to befriend them fails when his uncles try to torment and scare them away.

Casper gains the Harveys' trust when he serves them breakfast, and follows Kat to school, where she becomes popular when her class learns she is living in Whipstaff, and agrees to host their Halloween party there. Her envious classmate Amber plots with her friend, Vic (who Kat has a crush on), to humiliate Kat during the party. James attempts therapy sessions with the Ghostly Trio, who not only try to avoid them, but also reveal they know Amelia; in exchange for convincing Carrigan to leave them alone, they promise to go through the "red tape" involved to get James a meeting with his wife.

Kat learns Casper has no memory of his life, and restores his old playroom in the attic to remind him. Casper recognizes an old wooden sled his father bought him, and remembers playing outside until he caught a severe cold and died of pneumonia, becoming a ghost to keep his father company. A newspaper article reveals that Casper's father was declared legally insane after he built a machine, the Lazarus, which he claimed could bring the dead back to life. Casper and Kat venture to the basement and find the Lazarus. Carrigan and Dibs sneak inside and steal the formula that powers the machine, plotting to use it to grant themselves immortality. However, they attempt to kill each other to test the theory and retrieve the treasure they think is in the basement's locked vault. This culminates in Carrigan attempting to run Dibs over with her Range Rover, but instead crashing into a cliff-side tree; upon exiting her car, Carrigan falls to her death and looms as a ghost above Dibs.

James becomes despondent after the trio pulls a prank on him, prompting them to take him out on the town. They plan on killing him to make themselves a quartet, but have a change of heart after the drunken therapist declares he will tell Carrigan off so they can stay in their home. However, while still drunk, James accidentally falls to his death down a manhole.

In the laboratory, a furious ghostly Carrigan confronts Casper and Kat, stealing what she believes to be the treasure from the vault and launching Dibs out a window when he tries to double-cross her. As Carrigan demands to be brought back to life, Casper and Kat trick her into saying that she has no unfinished business on Earth, causing her to eject herself into the afterlife. After Carrigan's ghost disintegrates and disappears, the chest she had been holding crashes to the floor and the lid opens, revealing the treasure inside to be Casper's prized baseball, signed by Duke Snider; the map was part of a game Casper played with his father. James, now a ghost and still in his drunken state, returns with Casper's uncles; after bringing him back to his senses, Kat's despair over this prompts Casper to sacrifice his one chance to return to life, restoring James instead.

The Halloween party kicks off upstairs; Amber and Vic's prank is thwarted by the Ghostly Trio, and they flee in terror. Amelia, now an angel, meets with Casper alone in his toy room, crediting him for his bravery and sacrifice, and grants him a Cinderella-type deal that he can have until ten o'clock as his young, physical self, allowing him to attend the party and dance with Kat. Amelia meets with James, explaining that the Ghostly Trio kept their promise to get him a meeting with her, and tells him that she was so content with her family while alive that she has no unfinished business, encouraging him to move on. Amelia departs as the clock chimes ten, promising James that they and Kat will be together again one day; after kissing Kat, Casper transforms back into a ghost, inadvertently scaring off the guests. Kat is nonetheless impressed with the party, which James says is not over, cueing the Ghostly Trio to play their nephew's theme for them to dance to.

Cast
 Malachi Pearson as the voice of Casper McFadden, a lonely ghost who was originally a 12-year-old boy who died of pneumonia. He spends most of his afterlife in Whipstaff Manor, dealing with his ghostly ghoulish uncles' antics while hoping to find a friend. He finds one in Kat, while also developing a crush on her. 
 Devon Sawa portrays Casper in his human form
 Christina Ricci as Kathleen "Kat" Harvey, James' 13-year-old daughter and Casper's love interest who has lost her mother and wants to make a friend.
 Bill Pullman as Dr. James Harvey, Kat's father; a ghost therapist interacting with the 'living impaired', helping them to cross into the next dimension while hoping to find his deceased wife.
 Cathy Moriarty as Catherine "Carrigan" Crittenden, a glamorous, treacherous, and greedy woman upset about her late father only leaving Whipstaff Manor to her in his will. She discovers that the house contains a treasure, though unknown to her is only Casper's baseball. She hires Dr. Harvey to exorcise the ghosts in order to get it. Carrigan ultimately dies and becomes a ghost, before being ejected into the afterlife for all eternity. 
 Joe Nipote as the voice of Stretch, the hot tempered leader of the Ghostly Trio who bonds with Dr. Harvey. He is the eldest member of the trio.
 Brad Garrett as the voice of Fatso. He is usually the outlet for Stretch's anger, and he is known for being obese.
 Joe Alaskey as the voice of Stinkie. The quietest of the three, he is known for his odor, particularly his halitosis.
 Eric Idle as Paul "Dibs" Plutzker, Carrigan's attorney.
 Garette Ratliff Henson as Vic DePhillippi, Kat's crush and Amber's friend.
 Jessica Wesson as Amber Whitmire, Kat's rival and Vic's friend.
 Amy Brenneman as Amelia Harvey, James's deceased wife and Kat's mother.
 Ben Stein as Rugg, Carrigan's lawyer.
 Chauncey Leopardi and Spencer Vrooman as Nicky and Andreas, two preteen boys who explore Whipstaff in the opening scene.
 Wesley Thompson as Mr Curtis, Kat, Amber and Vic's form teacher.
 Michael McCarty as a bar drunk.

Cameos
 Don Novello as Father Guido Sarducci, called in by Carrigan to attempt an exorcism.
 Dan Aykroyd as Ray Stantz, called in by Carrigan to exterminate the Ghostly Trio.
 Fred Rogers (archive footage) 
 Terry Murphy
 Clint Eastwood as himself
 Rodney Dangerfield as himself
 Mel Gibson as himself
 John Kassir as The Crypt Keeper (voice)
 Brock Winkless performed the puppetry for the Crypt Keeper in the film
 Jess Harnell as the voice of Casper's Arnold Schwarzenegger impression

Production
Producer Steven Spielberg was planning a film adaptation of Casper the Friendly Ghost. He saw an episode of the television series Brooklyn Bridge directed by Brad Silberling and saw potential in this work, recruiting Silberling for directing Casper. Alex Proyas had initially signed on as director, but left due to creative differences with the screenplay. In an interview with Comic Book Resources, he claimed that he was intrigued with doing a children's fantasy, and wanted to do a more dark film, akin to The Wizard of Oz.  J. J. Abrams did an uncredited rewrite of the script. The screenplay gave a backstory of Casper being the ghost of Casper McFadden, a boy who died of pneumonia at 12, though some of the comics, particularly in the 1960s, portrayed him as born a ghost to ghost parents.

Extensive use of computer-generated imagery is used to create the ghosts, and it is the first feature film to have a fully CGI character in a leading role. In the mirror scene, Dr. Harvey was also supposed to transform into Spielberg. According to director Silberling, the cameo was filmed, but was cut for pacing reasons. Spielberg was relieved, feeling that he is not much of an actor himself and was nervous in front of the camera. Principal photography began on January 27, 1994, and ended on June 8, 1994.

Soundtrack
The soundtrack was composed by award-winning composer James Horner, who had worked on a number of previous movies for Amblin Entertainment, including An American Tail and The Land Before Time. The track "One Last Wish" would go on to accompany Universal Pictures' "Logos Through Time" Montage, as part of their centennial anniversary. The track "Descent into Lazarus" was used in a trailer for The Grinch, another film by Universal Pictures and has music by James Horner. The soundtrack was remastered and reissued as a commemorative twenty-fifth anniversary edition by La-La Land Records on August 4, 2020. The soundtrack was originally released however on April 29, 1995, almost five weeks before the film.

All tracks are performed by James Horner except where noted

Reception

Box office
Casper opened at #1 over the Memorial Day weekend, grossing $16.8 million over its first three days from 2,714 theaters, averaging $6,205 per theater. Over four days it grossed $22.1 million, averaging $8,140 per theater. It stayed at #1 in its second weekend, grossing another $13.4 million, and boosting its 10-day cume to $38.9 million. It played solidly all through the summer, ending up with a final gross of $100.3 million in North America, and an additional $187.6 million internationally, for a total worldwide gross of $287.9 million, far exceeding its $55 million budget and becoming a commercial success.

Critical response
Its critical consensus reads, "A meandering, mindless family movie that frequently resorts to special effects and transparent sappiness." Metacritic (which uses a weighted average) assigned Casper a score of 49 out of 100 based on 22 critics, indicating "mixed or average reviews". Audiences surveyed by CinemaScore gave the film a grade "A" on scale of A to F.

Time Out London described it as "an intimate and likeable film". Roger Ebert gave the film three out of four stars, calling it a "technical achievement, it's impressive, and entertaining. And there is even a little winsome philosophy." Robert Firsching of AllMovie gave the film his above average star rating while praising the film for its visual effects.

The CGI effects, which were considered cutting edge at the time, and the performances of the main cast were praised, especially considering that, in the scenes where the Harveys interact with the ghosts, Pullman and Ricci were actually acting either with nothing or with stand-in maquettes used as animators' references.

In his 2015 Movie Guide, Leonard Maltin gave the film a "BOMB" rating, objecting to the portrayal of Casper as a deceased child rather than a ghost.

Accolades

Legacy 
The success of Casper secured Silberling the job of directing the 1998 film City of Angels, a remake of Wings of Desire starring Nicolas Cage and Meg Ryan.

TV series
A cartoon series, The Spooktacular New Adventures of Casper, was released in 1996 based on the film. Fatso (Season 1–2), Stinkie, Stretch and Casper were all voiced by the actors from the film, while Dr. Harvey was voiced by Dan Castellaneta, and Kat voiced by Kath Soucie.

Prequels
With Harvey Entertainment retaining prequel rights to Casper, 20th Century Fox released two direct-to-video follow-ups to the film; an indirect prequel, Casper: A Spirited Beginning, and its sequel Casper Meets Wendy in 1998.

Cancelled sequel
Following the release of Casper, Simon Wells co-wrote a screenplay for Casper 2, which he was set to direct. However, in July 2000, it was reported that Universal Pictures had cancelled the sequel due to the disappointing sales from the direct-to-video Casper films and the hesitation of Christina Ricci.

Video games
There were several video games based on or tied-in with the film released on the major consoles of the time, such as the 3DO, Super NES, Sega Saturn, PlayStation, Game Boy Color and original Game Boy. A Casper game for Sega Genesis was planned but never released. An LCD handheld game was released for Tiger Electronics in 1995.

See also

 List of ghost films
 The Frighteners
 Duende

References

External links

 
 
 
 
 

1995 comedy-drama films
American comedy-drama films
1995 films
1990s fantasy comedy films
1990s ghost films
Amblin Entertainment films
American children's comedy films
American children's fantasy films
American films with live action and animation
American children's films
American comedy horror films
American fantasy comedy films
American ghost films
American haunted house films
Casper the Friendly Ghost films
Casper the Friendly Ghost
1990s English-language films
American films about Halloween
Films adapted into television shows
Films based on short fiction
Films directed by Brad Silberling
Films produced by Gerald R. Molen
Films scored by James Horner
Films set in the 1990s
Films set in Maine
Films set in country houses
Films shot in Maine
Live-action films based on animated series
Films based on American comics
Films based on Harvey Comics
Live-action films based on comics
Films with screenplays by Deanna Oliver
Films with screenplays by Sherri Stoner
Universal Pictures films
1995 directorial debut films
1995 fantasy films
Resurrection in film
Comedy crossover films
Films about father–daughter relationships
1990s American films